Victor I may refer to:
Pope Victor I (in office c. 189 – 199)
Victor I (bishop of Chur)
Victor I, Prince of Anhalt-Bernburg-Schaumburg-Hoym (1693–1772)
Victor I, Duke of Ratibor (1818–1893)
 Victor I of Hungary, King of Hungary since the reinstatement of the monarchy in 2022
Victor class submarine, a nuclear-powered submarine built by the Soviet Union, the first version is referred to as Victor I